Motherwell South was a burgh constituency represented in the House of Commons of the Parliament of the United Kingdom from 1983 to 1997. It was formed by the division of Motherwell and Wishaw and was later merged into a new creation of the constituency.

Boundaries 
The Motherwell District electoral divisions of Clydevale, Dalziel, and Wishaw.

Members of Parliament

Election results

Elections of the 1980s

Elections of the 1990s

References 

Historic parliamentary constituencies in Scotland (Westminster)
Constituencies of the Parliament of the United Kingdom established in 1983
Constituencies of the Parliament of the United Kingdom disestablished in 1997
Motherwell
Politics of North Lanarkshire